Cladosporium cladosporioides f. sp. pisicola is a fungal plant pathogen that affects pea plants.

References

External links 
 Index Fungorum
 USDA ARS Fungal Database

Fungal plant pathogens and diseases
Eudicot diseases
Cladosporium
Forma specialis taxa